The men's triple jump at the 1958 European Athletics Championships was held in Stockholm, Sweden, at Stockholms Olympiastadion on 22 and 23 August 1958.

Medalists

Results

Final
23 August

Qualification
22 August

Participation
According to an unofficial count, 23 athletes from 16 countries participated in the event.

 (1)
 (1)
 (1)
 (2)
 (2)
 (1)
 (1)
 (2)
 (1)
 (2)
 (2)
 (2)
 (2)
 (1)
 (1)
 (1)

References

Triple jump
Triple jump at the European Athletics Championships